Pyramids is a fantasy novel by British writer Terry Pratchett, published in 1989, the seventh book in his Discworld series. It won the BSFA Award for Best Novel in 1989.

Plot summary
The main character of Pyramids is Teppic (short for Pteppicymon XXVIII), the crown prince of the tiny kingdom of Djelibeybi (a pun on the candy Jelly Baby, meaning "Child of the Djel"), the Discworld counterpart to Ancient Egypt. The kingdom, founded seven-thousand years ago and formerly a great empire which dominated the continent of Klatch, has been in debt and recession for generations due to the construction of pyramids for the burial of its pharaohs and now occupies an area two miles wide along the 150-mile-long River Djel.

Young Teppic has been in training at the Assassins Guild in Ankh-Morpork for the past seven years, having been sent to bring in revenue for the kingdom. The day after passing his final exam by chance, he mystically senses that his father has died and that he must return home. Being the first Djelibeybian king raised outside the kingdom leads to some interesting problems, as Dios, the high priest, is a stickler for tradition, and does not actually allow the pharaohs to rule the country.

After numerous adventures and misunderstandings, Teppic (now Pteppicymon XXVIII) is forced to escape from the palace with a handmaiden named Ptraci, who was condemned to death for not wishing to die and serve the last king in the afterlife (despite Teppic wishing to pardon her). However, during the attempt, Dios discovers them and decrees that Teppic has killed the King (as the King is only recognised whilst wearing the Mask of the Sun and Dios reasons that Teppic's actions to save Ptraci would not be those of the King) and should be put to death. Meanwhile, the massive pyramid being built for Teppic's father (or, rather, in reaction to Dios's rejection of the old pharaoh's wish not to be buried in a pyramid) warps space-time so much that it "rotates" Djelibeybi out of alignment with the space/time of the rest of the Disc by ninety degrees.

Teppic and Ptraci travel to Ephebe to consult with the philosophers there as to how to get back inside the Kingdom. Meanwhile, pandemonium takes hold in Djelibeybi, as the kingdom's multifarious gods (many of whom occupy the same roles, such as Supreme God or God of the Sun) descend upon the populace, and all of Djelibeybi's dead rulers come back to life. Also, the nations of Ephebe and Tsort prepare for war with one another, as Djelibeybi can no longer act as a buffer zone between the two.

Eventually, Teppic re-enters the Kingdom and attempts to destroy the Great Pyramid, with the help of all of his newly resurrected ancestors. They are confronted by Dios, who, it turns out, is as old as the kingdom itself, and has advised every pharaoh throughout its history. Dios hates change and thinks Djelibeybi should stay the same. Teppic succeeds in destroying the Pyramid, returning Djelibeybi to the real world and sending Dios back through time (where he meets the original founder of the Kingdom, thereby restarting the cycle). Teppic then abdicates, allowing Ptraci (who turns out to be his half-sister) to rule. Ptraci immediately institutes much-needed changes, Teppic decides to travel the Disc, and Death comes to ferry the former rulers of Djelibeybi to the afterlife.

Characters
Teppic (short for Pteppicymon XXVIII), who left the kingdom to train at the Assassin's Guild of Ankh-Morpork as a boy, thus regarding himself more as Morporkian than Djelibeybian
Dios, the High Priest of Djelibeybi and chief minister
Pteppicymon XXVII, the late king of Djelibeybi and Teppic's father
Chidder, one of Teppic's classmates
Arthur Ludorum, one of Teppic's classmates and the son of Johan Ludorum, a famous assassin
Cheesewright, one of Teppic's classmates
Ptraci, a handmaiden of the late king and Teppic's half-sister
Dil and Gurn, master and apprentice embalmers tasked with mummifying Pteppicymon XXVII
Ptaclusp I, Ptaclusp IIa and Ptaclusp IIb, the pyramid-building dynasty tasked with the construction of the Great Pyramid

Major themes
The novel portrays a "time polder", a bubble which comprises a particular slice of history and a particular bit of geography. In this "polder", history repeats itself through Dios, and critic Stefan Ekman argues that a central theme of the novel is the struggle breaking free from the "polder", of leaving one's background behind.

References

External links

 
 Annotations for Pyramids
 Quotes from Pyramids
 Synopsis of Pyramids
 Pyramids at Worlds Without End

1989 British novels
Discworld books
1989 fantasy novels
Victor Gollancz Ltd books
Ancient Egypt in fiction
British comedy novels